The 2010 Papua New Guinea bus crash was a collision of two buses in Papua New Guinea on 14 January 2010. At least 40 people were killed after a Route 100 (Highway) Coaster bus and a Route 3 public motor vehicle (PMV, a refitted truck used for public transportation) crashed head-on in Papua New Guinea's worst ever road accident. The accident happened 130 km outside of Lae, in Morobe province.

It was described as "one of the saddest days in the history of road accidents", occurring in an "impoverished" country. The local morgue was unable to cope with demand as bodies from the crash piled up. Two of the dead may have been taken elsewhere which would leave the death toll at 42 if confirmed.

Crash
The two buses were intended to carry only twenty-five people each but were overloaded at the time of the incident. The drivers encountered potholes on the road and could not avoid a collision. Bodies were thrown through windows and across the road, some onto tar, some onto grass. Broken heads, limbs and necks were seen by onlookers. A policeman later said: "This accident appears to have occurred when both drivers tried to avoid potholes, and in the process collided".

Some local people rushed to assist those in need of attention, claiming they had never before seen such a "bloody and macabre" scene. Eighteen people were hospitalised in the aftermath of the accident. Eight of these people were left in intensive care. Some of these eight are not expected to survive. One passenger, 22-year-old Gideon Jack, said he was asleep at the time of the crash and woke up to find his bloodied body being loaded into a truck. Media in Papua New Guinea posted what were described by ABC Radio Australia's News as "shocking photographs of bodies hanging out of the mangled wreckage of the two buses".

The buses were described by media in Australia as "mangled wrecks". Angau Hospital in Lae saw its morgue packed with bodies and relatives came to check if anyone they knew was amongst them. The morgue was unable to cope as bodies kept coming in, prompting requests for refrigerator donations.

Response
Assistant Police Commissioner Giossi Labi described the crash as follows: "It is one of the saddest days in the history of road accidents where we have such a number of commuters die at once". He also accused bus drivers of speeding so they could make more money by getting to their destinations quicker and picking up more passengers.

Peter Guinness, a superintendent, said: "There are so many potholes along the highway. Some of these potholes are like craters. Now they basically wanted to avoid those potholes".

Koni Iguan, a parliamentarian, said it was "the most horrific accident" ever witnessed and described it as "This is the nastiest and bloodiest of accidents on the highway". Nearby villagers backed him up as he said no less than 10 deaths would be expected from such a horrific accident.

References

External links
  Crash Photo

Papua New Guinea Bus Crash, 2010
Papua New Guinea
Morobe Province
Bus incidents in Papua New Guinea
2010 disasters in Papua New Guinea